Supercon is a 2018 American action comedy film directed by Zak Knutson, who wrote the screenplay with Andy Sipes and Dana Snyder. It stars an ensemble cast including Ryan Kwanten, Maggie Grace, Mike Epps, Russell Peters, Clancy Brown, and John Malkovich.

The film was simultaneously released in limited theaters and on VOD in the United States on April 27, 2018, before being released on DVD and Blu-ray on June 5, 2018.

Plot
A group of former TV stars and comic book artists who make their living on the convention circuit decide to steal the earnings from the promoter.

Cast
 Ryan Kwanten as Matt Wheeler
 Russell Peters as Keith Mahar
 Maggie Grace as Allison McNealy
 Brooks Braselman as Brock Hutchinson
 Mike Epps as Gil Burkhaulter
 Clancy Brown as Adam King
 John Malkovich as Sid Newberry
 Caroline Fourmy as Ms Lily
 Tyrus as Callahan
 Donald Elise Watkins as Robert
 Hunter Burke as Sean
 Anthony Nguyen as Rocky
 CariDee English as Tall Blonde / Fiona
 Jeff Pope as Moderator
 Russell Tyrrell as Sound Tech
 Devyn A. Tyler as Tameron
 Zachary Hashemian as Young Keith As Hadji
 Zak Knutson as Judge Glover
 Matt Shurley as Jay Edwards
 Candi Brooks as Intern Cindy
 Bobbie Blanque as Intern Lisa
 Dana Snyder as Loudmouth Jerk

Production
It was confirmed on July 1, 2016, that Malkovich joined the cast of the film.

The film was shot in New Orleans.

Reception
Michael Ordona of Common Sense Media awarded the film two stars out of five.

References

External links
 
 

2018 films
2018 action comedy films
2010s heist films
American films based on actual events
American action comedy films
American heist films
Films about comics
Films scored by James L. Venable
Films shot in California
Films shot in Louisiana
Films shot in Miami
Films shot in New Orleans
2010s English-language films
2010s American films